The siege of the Troitsky monastery (Троицкая осада, Троицкое сидение in Russian, Siege of Saint Trinity) was an abortive attempt of the Polish–Lithuanian irregular army that acted in support of False Dmitry II to capture the Trinity Monastery (the modern Trinity Lavra of St. Sergius) north of Moscow. The siege lasted for 16 months, from 23 September 1608 until 12 January 1610.

The siege

In December 1608, the Polish army of some 15,000 men, led by Jan Piotr Sapieha and Aleksander Lisowski, laid siege to the fortress of the Trinity Monastery, which had been protecting the northern approaches to Moscow. The Russian garrison (estimated at between 2,200 and 2,400 men) consisted of dvoryane, streltsy, monastic servants, monks, and peasants, led by the voyevodas Prince Grigory Dolgorukov and Aleksey Golokhvastov.

In early October 1608, the attackers began shelling and mining the monastery. Numerous assaults in October and November were repelled by the Russians and resulted in heavy losses for the Polish army. The besieged undertook frequent sallies, one of which (9 November) ended with the explosion of a mine under a monastery tower and the destruction of an enemy battery on the Red Mountain, with two peasants, Shipov and Sloba, losing their lives during this sally.

There had been no significant military activity from late November 1608 until May 1609, but the besieged garrison suffered many casualties due to an outbreak of scurvy. In May through July 1609, the Russians repelled a number of enemy attacks. On 19 October 1609, and 4 January 1610, auxiliary detachments under the command of David Zherebtsov (900 men) and Grigory Valuyev (500 men) managed to make their way into the fortress. Under the threat of the approaching army of Mikhail Skopin-Shuisky, the Polish forces raised the siege on 12 January 1610 and retreated to Dmitrov.

Aftermath 
This defeat was a major blow for False Dmitry II. After King Sigismund III Vasa arrived at Smolensk in September 1609, the majority of his Polish supporters left him and joined with the armies of the Polish king. At the same time, a strong Russo-Swedish army under Mikhail Skopin-Shuisky and Jacob De la Gardie approached Tushino, forcing him to flee his camp disguised as a peasant and go to Kostroma. He was killed by his own men on 11 December 1610.

See also
 Time of Troubles
 Sigismund III of Poland

References

Troitse-Sergiyeva Lavra
Troitse-Sergiyeva Lavra
1608 in Europe
1609 in Europe
1610 in Europe
Conflicts in 1608
Conflicts in 1609
Conflicts in 1610
History of Moscow Oblast
1610 in Russia
1609 in Russia
1608 in Russia